Titus Buberník (12 October 1933 – 27 March 2022) was a Slovak footballer who played as a midfielder. He played for the Czechoslovakia national team in 23 matches scoring five goals.

He was a participant at the 1958 FIFA World Cup. He played in a match against Northern Ireland in his national team debut. In the 1962 FIFA World Cup his team won the silver medal.

Buberník played for the junior team of Slovan Bratislava, and later played for FC Košice and CH Bratislava.

Honours
CH Bratislava
 Czechoslovak First League: 1958–59

References

External links 

  ČMFS entry

1933 births
2022 deaths
People from Galanta District
Sportspeople from the Trnava Region
Slovak footballers
Czechoslovak footballers
Association football midfielders
Czechoslovakia international footballers
1958 FIFA World Cup players
1960 European Nations' Cup players
1962 FIFA World Cup players
ŠK Slovan Bratislava players
FK Inter Bratislava players
FC VSS Košice players
LASK players
Czechoslovak expatriate footballers
Czechoslovak expatriate sportspeople in Austria
Expatriate footballers in Austria